English Rugby Union Midland Division - Midlands 6 West (SW) is an English Rugby Union League.

Midlands 6 West (SW) is made up of teams from around the West Midlands of England who play home and away matches throughout a winter season. As with many low level they are often subject to re-structure

Promoted teams move up to Midlands 5 West (South).  Teams that are second place at the end of the season go into a play off with the second placed team in Midlands 6 West (SE).

Teams 2008-2009

Birmingham C.S.
Birmingham Exiles
Bredon Star
Bromyard
Chaddesley Corbett 
Claverdon 
Clee Hill  
Highley
Tenbury
Warley

References

 Rugby First: To view previous seasons in the league, search for any club within that league then click on to club details followed by fixtures and then select the appropriate season.

See also

 English rugby union system

7